Volpato is a surname. Notable people with the surname include:
Cristian Volpato (born 2003), Australian-Italian footballer
Giovanni Volpato (1735–1803), Italian engraver
Giovanna Volpato, Italian runner
Giovanni Battista Volpato (1633 – 1706) Italian painter
Paola Volpato, Chilean actress
Rej Volpato (born 1986), Italian footballer